Bedkot Municipality is in Kanchanpur District of Kanchanpur. Bedkot Municipality was formed on 18 September 2015 by merging Daiji and Suda VDCs. Bedkot Municipality Office is in Sisaiya Bazar.

It Has 11 numbers of ward at the first time but later on ward no.11 is renamed as ward no.10.

References

Kanchanpur District
Nepal municipalities established in 2015
Municipalities in Kanchanpur District